Roy Wills (born 5 December 1944) is a former English cricketer. Wills was a right-handed batsman who occasionally fielded as a wicket-keeper. He was educated at Abington, Northamptonshire.

Wills made his first-class debut for Northamptonshire against Oxford University in 1963. He made 32 further first-class appearances for the county, the last of which came against Kent in the 1969 County Championship. In his 33 first-class appearances, he scored a total of 824 runs an average of 17.16, with a high score of 151 not out. This score was his only century and came against Cambridge University in 1966. Although the 1969 season marked his final first-class appearance, he did later make a single List A appearance for Northamptonshire against Warwickshire in the 1973 Benson & Hedges Cup, scoring 11 runs before being dismissed by David Brown.

His son-in-law Rob Bailey played first-class cricket and Test cricket for England.

References

External links

1944 births
Living people
Cricketers from Northampton
English cricketers
Northamptonshire cricketers
People from Abington, Northamptonshire